The Marshall University Forensic Science Center, located in Huntington, West Virginia, houses a two-year graduate program in forensic science and the state of West Virginia's Combined DNA Index System (CODIS) laboratory facility.

Marshall University
Forensics organizations
Buildings and structures in Huntington, West Virginia